Nicolas Horvath (born 1977, in Monaco) is a French pianist and electroacoustic composer.

Education 

At 10, Nicolas Horvath was selected for a program initiated by Monaco's Princess Grace for children with musical predispositions. 
He received the Academie de Musique Prince Rainier III Prize unanimously with the congratulations of the jury.

At the age of 15, during an Academie de Musique Prince Rainier III competition, he was discovered by the conductor Lawrence Foster
who obtained a scholarship from Princess Grace Foundation allowing him to work for three consecutive summers at Aspen Music Festival and School with Gabriel Chodos. On his return, he worked for two years with Gérard Frémy who introduced him to contemporary music.

In 1998, he joined the École Normale de Musique in Paris. Beginning in 2002 he worked for four years with Bruno Leonardo Gelber and Germaine Deveze who asked him not to give any concert or participate in any competition during his apprenticeship. Then he left l'École Normale. In 2004, he joined Gino Favotti's electroacoustic composition class where he received masterclasses from François Bayle and Christian Zanési and in 2006 Christine Groult's electroacoustic composition class.

From 2008 to 2011, he won numerous international competitions such as the Luigi Nono Competition, Alexander Scriabin, Osaka, Fukuoka, Yokohama. In 2010, he joined the Oxana Yablonskaya Piano School and The International Certificate for Piano Artists. Meetings with Leslie Howard, Gabriel Tacchino, Philippe Entremont, and Éric Heidsieck, mark his career.

Career 
Nicolas Horvath collaborates with composers such as Régis Campo, Denis Levaillant, Jaan Rääts, Tõnu Kõrvits, Alvin Curran, Fabio Mengozzi, William Susman, Alp Durmaz, Andre Bangambula Vindu, Mamoru Fujieda ... he ensures the creation of pieces of more than two hundred composers and more than a hundred pieces are dedicated to him.
Nicolas Horvath also plays little-known works such as Franz Liszt's Christus, Claude Debussy's The Fall of the House of Usher, the complete version of Erik Satie's The Son of the Stars as well as forgotten, neglected composers such as Moondog, Hélène de Montgeroult, Ludovic Lamothe, Jacques Champion de Chambonnières, Friedrich Kalkbrenner, Élisabeth Jacquet de La Guerre, Nobuo Uematsu, Charles-Valentin Alkan, Karl August Hermann...

Nicolas Horvath stands out by organizing marathon concerts such as Erik Satie's Vexations which he performed 12 times alone and without any stop or break, the Nights of Minimalist Piano and the complete Erik Satie or Philip Glass piano music.

On April 21, 2012, with Andrea Clanetti Santarossa, they did in Monaco's Entrepot Gallery the very first Monacan happening on La Monte Young music. Some of the audience was scandalized by it and left the gallery shouting.

On December 12, 2012, he gave in Paris's museum Palais de Tokyo a non-stop solo version of 35 hours of Erik Satie's Vexations. Starting December 12 at noon and ending December 13 at 11 pm.

From the June 23 to July 27, 2013, he was invited by the DO NOT OPEN Gallery in Brussels to give his first exhibit, highly influenced by Clyfford Still & Hermann Nitsch

On April 11, 2014, in the Palais de Tokyo, he premiered the GlassWorlds, a gigantic Philip Glass Homage where 120 composers from 56 countries and all musical genres wrote a work for this program.

On January 9, 2015, in Carnegie Hall, New York, he premiered the Complete 20 Philip Glass Etudes.

On October 10 to 12, 2015, in Paris's Le Grand Rex, for the 1st encore of Danny Elfman's anniversary concert, Nicolas Horvath was in duet with the composer himself to perform Elfman's Oogie Boogie's song.

On October 31, 2015, The Gallery of Estonia (the Estonian pavilion) as part of the Milan World Expo closing day invited him to give the first Jaan Rääts music only recital.

On May 25, 2016, he gave a Jaan Rääts recital at Strasbourg European Parliament for the inauguration Ceremony of Estonia at the lead of the Council of Europe.

On the night of October 1 to 2, 2016, at the Paris Philharmonie Boulez Hall, he performed a twelve-hour-long marathon of piano works by Philip Glass.

In April 2017, he requested to all Jaan Rääts' students, such as Erkki-Sven Tüür, Tõnu Kõrvits, Timo Steiner, Kerri Kotta ... to compose each of them an exclusive piece for an all-Estonia Jaan Rääts Homage tour (for the 85th anniversary of composer).

On March 18, 2018, he gives a world premiere in Nantes during the Festival Variations the complete piano music of Erik Satie.

On March 24, 2018, he is invited by the Labenche Museum in Brive-la-Gaillarde to give a Claude Debussy recital for his centenary on the composer's last piano. During this concert Nicolas Horvath premiered Claude Debussy works completed by the musicologist Robert Orledge.

On September 9, 2018, he gives the world premiere of Moondog 's Complete Book of Canons n°1, 2 & 3 and The Great Canon in Toulouse for the Opening Concert of the Moondog Season and for the Piano aux Jacobins Festival.

On April 28, 2019, he is the first pianist ever to perform in a single concert and without any break all 15 Karlheinz Stockhausen's Klavierstuke for solo piano in Nantes for the Variations Festival.

On Mai 17 & 18, 2019, he was selected by Philip Glass himself to perform Glass' etudes 13 & 14 during the Philip Glass & Friends concerts at the Philharmonie de Paris.

Discography

Classical Music

Anne-Louise Brillon de Jouy: The Piano Sonatas Rediscovered. 2 CD Naxos – Grand Piano Records, 2021
Karl Czerny : 30 Études de Mécanisme, Op. 849 , CD Naxos  – Grand Piano Records, 2019
Claude Debussy : The Unknown Debussy - Rare Piano Music, CD Naxos – Grand Piano Records, 2020
Karl August Hermann : Complete Piano Music , CD Toccata Classics, 2018
Franz Liszt : Christus , CD Editions Horus, 2012
Hélène de Montgeroult : The Complete Piano Sonatas , 2 CD Naxos – Grand Piano Records, 2021
Erik Satie : Nuit Erik Satie Live at Philharmonie de Paris, DVD Blu-ray HD – Grand Piano Records, 2022
Erik Satie : Complete Piano Works, New Salabert Edition vol.4 , CD Naxos – Grand Piano Records, 2019
Erik Satie : Complete Piano Works, New Salabert Edition vol.3 , Naxos – Grand Piano Records, 2018 
Erik Satie : Complete Piano Works, New Salabert Edition vol.2 , CD Naxos – Grand Piano Records, 2018
Erik Satie : Complete Piano Works, New Salabert Edition vol.1 , CD Naxos – Grand Piano Records, 2017
Germaine Tailleferre : Her Piano Works, Revived vol.1, CD Naxos – Grand Piano Records, 2022

Contemporary / Minimalist / Experimental Music
Thérèse Brenet : Le Visionnaire CD Editions Musik Fabrik, 2012
John Cage : In a Landscape, Digital Collection 1001 Notes / CD ACEL – Nicolas Horvath Discoveries, 2022
Cornelius Cardew : Treatise (Harsh-Noise version) , CD Demerara Records, 2016
Jean Catoire : Complete Piano Works Boxset, 28CD ACEL – Nicolas Horvath Discoveries, 2022
Jean Catoire : Complete Piano Works Vol.8, Digital Collection 1001 Notes – Nicolas Horvath Discoveries, 2022
Jean Catoire : Complete Piano Works Vol.7, Digital Collection 1001 Notes – Nicolas Horvath Discoveries, 2022
Jean Catoire : Complete Piano Works Vol.6, Digital Collection 1001 Notes – Nicolas Horvath Discoveries, 2022
Jean Catoire : Complete Piano Works Vol.5, Digital Collection 1001 Notes – Nicolas Horvath Discoveries, 2022
Jean Catoire : Complete Piano Works Vol.4, Digital Collection 1001 Notes – Nicolas Horvath Discoveries, 2022
Jean Catoire : Complete Piano Works Vol.3, Digital Collection 1001 Notes – Nicolas Horvath Discoveries, 2022
Jean Catoire : Complete Piano Works Vol.2, Digital Collection 1001 Notes  – Nicolas Horvath Discoveries, 2022
Jean Catoire : Complete Piano Works Vol.1, Digital Collection 1001 Notes  – Nicolas Horvath Discoveries, 2021 
Melaine Dalibert : En Abyme, Digital Collection 1001 Notes / CD ACEL – Nicolas Horvath Discoveries, 2022
Julius Eastman : Three Extended Pieces for Four Pianos, 2 CD & 2 33 tours, Sub Rosa, 2021
Philip Glass : Essentials II : LP 85th anniversary tribute, 33 tours Naxos – Grand Piano Records, 2022
Philip Glass : Essentials : LP 80th anniversary tribute , 33 tours Naxos – Grand Piano Records, 2017
Philip Glass : GlassWorlds  vol.6 , CD Naxos – Grand Piano Records, 2019
Philip Glass : GlassWorlds  vol.5 , CD Naxos – Grand Piano Records, 2016
Philip Glass : GlassWorlds  vol.4 , CD Naxos – Grand Piano Records, 2016
Philip Glass : GlassWorlds  vol.3 , CD Naxos – Grand Piano Records, 2016
Philip Glass : GlassWorlds  vol.2 , CD Naxos – Grand Piano Records, 2015
Philip Glass : GlassWorlds  vol.1 , CD Naxos – Grand Piano Records, 2015
Hans Otte : The Book of Sounds, Digital Collection 1001 Notes / 2CD ACEL – Nicolas Horvath Discoveries, 2022
Dennis Johnson : November, Digital Collection 1001 Notes / 6CD ACEL  – Nicolas Horvath Discoveries, 2022
Tom Johnson : One Hour for Piano, Digital Collection 1001 Notes  / CD ACEL – Nicolas Horvath Discoveries, 2022
Tom Johnson : The Chord Catalogue, Digital Collection 1001 Notes  / 4CD ACEL  – Nicolas Horvath Discoveries, 2022
Alvin Lucier : Music for Piano XL, CD Naxos - Grand Piano Records, 2021 
Nicolas Horvath :  Improvisation Ritual (in the Hyoscamus Thurneman compilation), Book CD, Ajna Offensive, 2020
Jaan Rääts : Complete Piano Sonatas Vol.1 , CD Naxos – Grand Piano Records, 2017
Morteza Shirkoohi : Divine Thoughts, Digital Collection 1001 Notes  / CD ACEL – Nicolas Horvath Discoveries, 2022
William Susman : Quiet Rhythms Book I, Digital Collection 1001 Notes  / CD Belarca – Nicolas Horvath Discoveries, 2022
Michael Vincent Waller : The South Shore (Pasticcio per meno è più, CD1 - track 5) , CD XI Records, 2015The French avant-garde in the 20th century : (Claude Debussy, Marcel Duchamp, Olivier Greif, Jean Catoire, Philippe Hersant) :  , CD LTM Recordings, 20145) , CD XI Records, 2015

Video Game Music
Little Big Adventure : Symphonic Suite & OST, (Little Big Adventure Wayô Piano Collection (CD2 track 10 to 13 + 2 bonus track on digital release) transcription by Nicolas Horvath) 2CD Wayô Records, 2021
Final Fantasy VII :  The Complete Piano Opéra & Piano Collection, Digital Piano Brilliant Recordings, 2021
Final Fantasy VII : The Complete OST (One-Winged Angel ~ Virtuoso version (piste 17) transcription by Nicolas Horvath, Digital Piano Brilliant Recordings, 2020
Magician Lord : Original Soundtrack (Magician Lord Wayô Piano Collection (piste 19) transcription by Nicolas Horvath), CD & LP Wayô Records, 2020

Chamber music
Thérèse Brenet : Le Visionnaire, Editions Musik Fabrik, 2012
Julius Eastman : Three Extended Pieces for Four Pianos, 2 CD 2 LP, Sub Rosa, 2021

Collaborations
Merzbow + Nicolas Horvath : PiaNoise, CD Sub Rosa, 2022
Opening Performance Orchestra + Nicolas Horvath : Fluxus Edition, CD Sub Rosa 2022
Lustmord + Nicolas Horvath : The Fall / Dennis Johnson's November Deconstructed, CD, 2 LP Sub Rosa, 2020
Melek-Tha + Nicolas Horvath : Les Montagnes du Délire Sonores, 6 CD + LP

Electroacoustic / Dark Ambient

N.Horvath : The Tape Years, 6 CDR La Fabrique des Reves, 2020
N.Horvath : Twilight Amorphousness Of The Vague Abysses, CDR Valse Sinistre Productions, 2015
N.Horvath : At The Mountains Of Madness, CDR Valse Sinistre Productions, 2015
N.Horvath : The Dreams In The Witch-House, CDR Valse Sinistre Productions, 2015
N.Horvath : La Tentation d'exister, Artistic LP AH AH AH Éditions – LBDLC, 2015
N.Horvath : Acedia, Digital Demerara Records, 2016
Dapnom : Paralipomènes à la Divine Comédie, CD Mors Ultima Ratio, 2011
Dapnom : Live in Paris, Tape Ogmios Underground, 2010
Dapnom + Melek-Tha : Omnium Finis Imminent, 2 CD Fire Of Fire Records, 2008
Dapnom + Kenji Siratori : Nhir-otkiv Yima'k, CD Sabbathid Records, 2008
Dapnom : 魔界, Tape Sabbathid Records, 2007
Dapnom : Baalberith, Pro CDR Le Mal Dominant, 2007
Dapnom : ...Unio Mystica, Tape Ars Funebris records, 2007
Dapnom : Actes Préalables, CD Insidious Poinsoning Records, 2007
Dapnom : Verklärte Nacht, CD Sonic Tyranny Records, 2006
Dapnom : Mind Control, CD Sonic Tyranny Records, Tape Regimental Records, 2006
Dapnom : Potestatem, 6 Tape , Akedia Rex, 2006
Dapnom : S'oho... Aiy uhe en-oghg (a.p. III), Tape SP Records, 2006
Dapnom : Ert Brvueazv 0 (a.p. I), Tape Gravestench, 2005
Dapnom : Regwoisvokwos Gwhenmi Welminti, Tape Necrocosm Records, 2005
Dapnom : Melenoiserkwos, Tape Basilisk records, 2005
Dapnom : ∅, Tape Sadolust records, 2005
Dapnom : Dvoeskreb, Tape Meurtre Noir Records, 2005
Dapnom : 1951-N "Black Abstract Expressionism", Tape Insidious Poisoning rec, 2005
Dapnom : De Profundis, Tape Antihumanism Records, 2004
A.E.P. : Harawata no Shouki, Tape Titan Woods, 2011
A.E.P. + Vinterriket : Praeludia Lucis Noctis, CD Asphyxiate Recordings, Tape Ars Funebris Records, 2007
A.E.P. + Black Seas of Infinity : Kâmarûpa, CD Sonic Tyranny Production, 2007, Tape Ravenheart, 2006
A.E.P. : Тёмные Огни, Pro CDR Art of Anticreation, Tape Symbollic prod, 2006
A.E.P. : Aïn, Tape Tour De Garde, 2006
A.E.P. : THIS IS NOT MUSIC, Tape Fogart Productions, 2006
A.E.P. : Les Montagnes Hallucinées, Pro CDR Occultum Production, 2006
A.E.P. : Noir voyage obstrué de rencontres difformes, Tape Infernal Kommando, 2006
A.E.P. : Demos 1 + 2, Tape Todestrieb records, 2005
A.E.P. : ...Kaiwelos, Tape Insikt, 2005
A.E.P. : Nos'leh Cifnoy-räam, Tape MN Records, 2005
A.E.P. : Enifubos..., Tape MN Records, 2005

Publications

Booklets 
2012 : Franz Liszt – Christus, (Liszt – Christus, Hortus Edition H100)
2015 : Glassworlds, (GlassWorlds Vol.1, Naxos – Grand Piano GP677)
2015 : Philip Glass Complete Piano Etudes, (Livret : GlassWorlds Vol.2, Naxos – Grand Piano GP690)
2016 : The Metamorphose, (GlassWorlds Vol.3, Naxos – Grand Piano GP691)
2016 : On Love, (GlassWorlds Vol.4, Naxos – Grand Piano GP692)
2016 : Enlightenment, (GlassWorlds Vol.5, Naxos – Grand Piano GP745)
2019 : AMERICA, (GlassWorlds Vol.6, Naxos – Grand Piano GP817)
2021 : co-authored with Deborah Hayes, Anne-Louise Brillon de Jouy's piano sonatas, (Brillon de Jouy - The Piano Sonatas Rediscovered,  Naxos – Grand Piano GP872-73)
2021 : co-authored with Deborah Hayes, Hélène de Montgeroult's piano sonatas (Hélène de Montgeroult - Complete Piano Sonatas,  Naxos – Grand Piano GP885-86)

Articles 
2016 : Jaan Rääts biography, (Programme des  Activités Culturelles et Promotionnelles du Conseil de l'Europe, Conseil de l'Europe)
2018 : Dr Jekyll & Mister Hyde, (Régis Campo, Musique de l'émerveillement. Aedam Musicae)
2019 : Alvin Lucier's Music for Piano with Slow Sweep Pure Wave Oscillators XL, (Notice de concert - Deep Listen. Festival Musica Strasbourg)
2021 : On Jean Catoire piano music  (Booklet : Jean Catoire Complete piano music Nicolas Horvath Discoveries (Collection 1001 Notes / ACEL)
2022 : co-authored with Marie-Lise Babonneau, Régis Campo, David Christoffel and Yannis Constantinides, Parachever (Les Annales de Metaclassique - Vol. II. Aedam Musicae)

French translations 
2015 : Glassworlds, (GlassWorlds Vol.1, Naxos – Grand Piano GP677)
2015 : Les Études pour piano de Philip Glass, (Livret : GlassWorlds Vol.2, Naxos – Grand Piano GP690)
2016 : La Métamorphose, (GlassWorlds Vol.3, Naxos – Grand Piano GP691)
2016 : Amour à mourir, (GlassWorlds Vol.4, Naxos – Grand Piano GP692)
2016 : L’illumination, (GlassWorlds Vol.5, Naxos – Grand Piano GP745)
2017 : Erik Satie - Complete Piano Work, New Salabert Edition Vol.1, (Naxos – Grand Piano GP761)
2018 : Erik Satie - Complete Piano Work, New Salabert Edition Vol.2, (Naxos – Grand Piano GP762) 
2018 :  Erik Satie - Complete Piano Work, New Salabert Edition Vol.3, (Naxos – Grand Piano GP763)
2019 : AMERICA, (GlassWorlds Vol.6, Naxos – Grand Piano GP817)
2019 : Erik Satie - Complete Piano Work, New Salabert Edition Vol.4, (Naxos – Grand Piano GP823)

English translations 
2021 : Jean Catoire : Complete Piano Works all volumes, Digital Collection 1001 Notes / 28CD ACEL – Nicolas Horvath Discoveries
2022 : William Susman : Quiet Rhythms Book I, Digital Collection 1001 Notes  / CD Belarca – Nicolas Horvath Discoveries
2022 : Morteza Shirkoohi : Divine Thoughts, Digital Collection 1001 Notes / CD ACEL – Nicolas Horvath Discoveries
2022 : Dennis Johnson : November, Digital Collection 1001 Notes / 6CD ACEL–  Nicolas Horvath Discoveries
2022 : John Cage : In a Landscape, Digital Collection 1001 Notes / CD ACEL – Nicolas Horvath Discoveries
2022 : Hans Otte : The Book of Sounds, Digital Collection 1001 Notes / 2CD ACEL – Nicolas Horvath Discoveries
2022 : Tom Johnson : One Hour for Piano, Digital Collection 1001 Notes / CD ACEL – Nicolas Horvath Discoveries
2022 : Melaine Dalibert : En Abyme, Digital Collection 1001 Notes / CD ACEL – Nicolas Horvath Discoveries
2022 : Tom Johnson : The Chord Catalogue, Digital Collection 1001 Notes / 4CD ACEL – Nicolas Horvath Discoveries

References

External links 
 Official website.
 Bandcamp page.
 GlassWorlds project official website.
 Naxos' Nicolas Horvath artist page. 
 Discogs page.
 Steinway Artists' Nicolas Horvath minisite.
 French Interview.
 English Interview.

1977 births
21st-century French male classical pianists
Avant-garde pianists
Living people